Teagan O'Keeffe (born 10 November 1992) is a South African female BMX rider, representing her nation at international competitions.

She competed in the time trial event and race event at the 2015 UCI BMX World Championships.

References

External links
 
 
 www.x-streambalanceco.za
 www.bicycling.co.za
 www.fatbmx.com
 www.cyclingdirect.co.za
 www.cyclingsa.com
 www.cyclingsa.com
 gsport.co.za

1992 births
Living people
BMX riders
South African female cyclists
Cyclists at the 2010 Summer Youth Olympics
Place of birth missing (living people)
21st-century South African women